Motaung is an African surname that may refer to
Anastasia Motaung, South African politician 
Kaizer Motaung (born 1944), South African football player
Kaizer Motaung Junior (born 1981), South African football striker
Oziel Hlalele Motaung, member of the Pan-African Parliament from Lesotho
Sizwe Motaung (1970–2001), South African football player 
Tshepo Motaung (born 1999), South African cricketer

Surnames of African origin